Alexander Stadler (born 16 October 1999) is a German field hockey player who plays as a goalkeeper for Dutch Hoofdklasse club Den Bosch and the German national team.

He competed in the 2020 Summer Olympics.

Club career
Stadler played the first part of his senior career for TSV Mannheim. In 2022 he left Germany to play in the Dutch Hoofdklasse for Den Bosch.

International career
Stadler was part of the under-21 Germany squad which won the 2019 Men's EuroHockey Junior Championship, he was named the best goalkeeper at the tournament. On 28 May 2021, he was named as the first goalkeeper in the senior squad for the 2021 EuroHockey Championship and the 2020 Summer Olympics. He won the silver medal at the 2021 EuroHockey Championship as they lost the final to the Netherlands after a shoot-out.

Honours

International
Germany U21
 EuroHockey Junior Championship: 2019

Individual
 EuroHockey Junior Championship Best Goalkeeper: 2019

References

External links
 

1999 births
Living people
Sportspeople from Heidelberg
Field hockey players at the 2020 Summer Olympics
German male field hockey players
Olympic field hockey players of Germany
Male field hockey goalkeepers
Men's Feldhockey Bundesliga players
Men's Hoofdklasse Hockey players
HC Den Bosch players
2023 Men's FIH Hockey World Cup players
21st-century German people